Dana Dajani is a Palestinian actress and writer. Her performance as a visually impaired woman who regains her sight won her the "Best Actress" award at Tropfest Arabia 2011. The film was co-scripted by her and screened at Cannes Short Film Corner in 2012. Dajani gained further acclaim for her activism for Palestine through artistic work, including her spoken-word poem "Love Letters from Palestine".

Education and early career
Dajani began her undergraduate career at the University of Kansas, acting in productions for Paul Lim's English Alternative Theater (EAT). After performing with EAT at the Kennedy Center American College Theatre Festival, and competing for the Irene Ryan Acting Scholarship, Dajani left KU and moved to Chicago to begin her professional career. During her semester off, she acted in several student short films in Chicago. Through these student directors, Dajani discovered Columbia College Chicago. She transferred to the School of Theatre and graduated  magna cum laude in May 2010 with a Bachelor of Fine Arts degree in Theater with an emphasis in acting.

During her time in the Windy City, Dajani performed on many of Chicago's "storefront" stages and participated in festivals such as Teatro Luna's 10x10, Rhinofest, and Abbiefest XXI & XXII. Dajani's last main-stage performance in Chicago was in Adventure Stage Chicago's production of Sinbad: The Untold Tale, an action-packed play in which she fought using shamshir and rapier blades.

Current career
In 2011, Dajani moved to Dubai. On stage, Dajani wrote and starred in Kalubela, winner of Time Out Dubai's award for "Best Theatrical Performance of 2012". Her short films have been in film festivals across the Middle East, garnering awards such as "Best Actress" in Tropfest 2011 and "Best Film" at the Arab Film Studio Competition 2013.  Later that same year, Dajani was invited to Australia to develop and perform a new work at the Sydney Opera House.  The play, Oneness: Voice Without Form was commissioned for the 150th anniversary of the birth of Swami Vivekananda. Dajani played 5 roles, including that of Sister Nevedita.

In addition to theatre and cinema, Dajani is an event MC and presenter in Dubai. She has participated in headlining corporate events as diverse as black-tie galas to a staff retreats. Clients include Coca-Cola, Bridgestone, Etisalat, Damas, Johnson & Johnson, Bayt.com, Essilor and others.

Spoken-word poetry
Dajani is a published author and poet and often performs her spoken-word poetry solo in a theatrical style. She has toured internationally to perform, including opening for Cairokee on their UK tour in 2018.

Dajani has recorded two poetry and musical albums in 2013. “Free Flow Live” was the first EP of her musical collaboration called Floetics. A freestyle riff on rhythm and rhyme, Floetics have performed at many premier music venues and festivals in Dubai such as SIKKA Art Fair, The Music Room, Jazz@Pizza Express, FORTOM- First Ladies (For The Love of Music), Dubai Yoga & Music Festival, Freshly Ground Sounds, and DIFC Art Night.

Her second EP was in collaboration with Dubai-based analogue electronic producer, Aaron Kim aka Tacit. The EP, "type two error" features 4 tracks and is available on iTunes. The duo have performed at festivals across the UAE including Mother of the Nation, Festival@ Ideas Forum, and Sikka Art Fair.

Activism for Palestine
In 2013, Kharabeesh  and Visualizing Palestine released a YouTube video called "The ACTUAL Truth about Palestine", in response to 3 videos created by the Israeli Minister of Foreign Affairs, Danny Ayalon. The "ACTUAL Truth" video, featuring Dajani and Lara Sawalha, went viral—garnering 300,000 views in a few weeks. Danny Ayalon responded to the video in a "Rebuttal."

A recording of the live performance of Dajani's spoken word piece, "Love Letters from Palestine" also gained international attention. She recorded a poem-film of "Love Letters from Palestine" in Bethlehem, and released the film during Nakba Commemoration Day in May 2014.

Dajani has organized pro-Palestinian events such as "This is Palestine" and "Recognizing Palestine" in Dubai. At the later event, she performed Caryl Churchill's play for Gaza, Seven Jewish Children, and raised funds for the organization Medical Aid for Palestinians (MAP).

Partial list of films
 Tooth of Hope
At First Sight
 In Her Eyes
 The Actual Truth About Palestine
 Melody
 1% Inspiration
 Angel Trumpets, Devil Trombones
 Maybe We Should Go

References

External links
 
 Soundcloud
 

Living people
Palestinian dramatists and playwrights
Palestinian women writers
21st-century Palestinian poets
Palestinian screenwriters
Palestinian women poets
Women dramatists and playwrights
21st-century Palestinian actresses
Palestinian film actresses
Year of birth missing (living people)
University of Kansas alumni
Place of birth missing (living people)
21st-century Palestinian women writers
21st-century screenwriters